Cecil County Public Schools is a public school system serving the residents of Cecil County, Maryland. Demographics, assessments, and statistics are available on the Maryland Report Card website. 

It is the school district for the entire county.

High schools

Bohemia Manor High School, Chesapeake City, MD
Elkton High School, Elkton, MD
North East High School, North East, MD
Perryville High School, Perryville, MD
Rising Sun High School, North East, MD

Middle schools
Bohemia Manor, Chesapeake City, MD
Cherry Hill, Elkton, MD
Elkton, Elkton, MD
North East, North East, MD
Perryville, Perryville, MD
Rising Sun, Rising Sun, MD

Elementary schools

Bainbridge, Port Deposit
Bay View, North East
Calvert, Rising Sun
Cecil Manor, Elkton
Cecilton, Cecilton
Charlestown, Charlestown
Chesapeake City, Chesapeake City
In 2019 a groundbreaking for the new school facility, along Augustine Herman Highway at the midpoint between the Bohemia Manor secondary schools and the Cheseapeake City fire department facility, was imminent. The building's model is Gilpin Manor Elementary School.
Conowingo, Conowingo
Elk Neck, Elkton
Gilpin Manor, Elkton
Holly Hall, Elkton
Kenmore, Elkton 
Leeds, Elkton
North East, North East
Perryville, Perryville
Port Deposit, Port Deposit
Rising Sun, Rising Sun
Thomson Estates, Elkton

Other
Cecil Alternative Program at Providence, Elkton, MD
Cecil County School of Technology, Elkton, MD

News 

In the fall of 2015, the new Cecil County School of Technology opened in Elkton, MD.

Schools on the 29th of October 2021 closed early due to inclement weather in the area. The superintend of Cecil County Public Schools is quoted as saying: "We boldly do not assume this will happen again due to the online nature schools are heading into."

References

External links

School districts in Maryland
Education in Cecil County, Maryland